Mercury Systems, Inc. is a technology company serving the aerospace and defense industry. It designs, develops and manufactures open architecture computer hardware and software products, including secure embedded processing modules and subsystems, avionics mission computers and displays, rugged secure computer servers, and trusted microelectronics components, modules and subsystems.

Mercury sells its products to defense prime contractors, the US government and original equipment manufacturer (OEM) commercial aerospace companies.

Mercury is based in Andover, Massachusetts, with more than 2300 employees and annual revenues of approximately US$924 million for its fiscal year ended June 30, 2021.

History 
 Founded on July 14, 1981 as Mercury Computer Systems by Jay Bertelli.
Went public on the Nasdaq stock exchange on January 30, 1998, listed under the symbol MRCY.
 In July 2005, Mercury Computer Systems acquired Echotek Corporation for approximately US$49 million.
 In January 2011, Mercury Computer Systems acquired LNX Corporation.
In December, 2011, Mercury Computer Systems acquired KOR Electronics for US$70 million,
 In August 2012, Mercury Computer Systems acquired Micronetics for US$74.9 million.
 In November 2012, the company changed its name from Mercury Computer Systems to Mercury Systems.
 In December 2015, Mercury Systems acquired Lewis Innovative Technologies, Inc. (LIT).
 In November 2016, Mercury Systems acquired Creative Electronic Systems for US$38 million.
 In April 2017, Mercury Systems acquired Delta Microwave, LLC (“Delta”) for US$40.5 million, enabling the Company to expand into the satellite communications (SatCom), datalinks and space launch markets.
 In July 2017, Mercury Systems acquired Richland Technologies, LLC (RTL), increasing the Company's market penetration in commercial aerospace, defense platform management, C4I, and mission computing.
In January 2019, Mercury Systems acquired GECO Avionics, LLC for US$36.5 million.
In December 2020, Mercury Systems acquired Physical Optics Corporation (POC) for $310 million.
In May 2021, Mercury Systems acquired Pentek for $65.0 million.
In November, 2021 Mercury Systems acquired Avalex Technologies Corporation and Atlanta Micro, Inc.

Facilities

Manufacturing centers
Mercury manufactures in New England, New York Metro-area, Southern California and a trusted DMEA facility in the Southwest, which has Missile Defense Agency approval and AS9100 certification. Four Mercury sites have been awarded the James S. Cogswell Award for Outstanding Industrial Security Achievement Award by the Defense Counterintelligence and Security Agency (DCSA).

References

External links 
 

Manufacturing companies based in Massachusetts
Companies based in Essex County, Massachusetts
Andover, Massachusetts
Signal processing
Signals intelligence
Radio frequency propagation
Middleware
Cell BE architecture
Aerospace companies of the United States
Defense companies of the United States
American companies established in 1981
Technology companies established in 1981
1981 establishments in Massachusetts
Companies listed on the Nasdaq